Kishna Ram Vishnoi (born 1 July 1965) is a member of the Rajasthan Legislative Assembly. He is a member of the Indian national congress and represents the Lohawat (Rajasthan Assembly constituency) in Jodhpur District.

Personal life 
Kishna Ram Vishnoi was born in village Sadri, Tehsil Lohawat, Jodhpur, Rajasthan. He graduated from Jai Narain Vyas University Jodhpur. He is married to Dhani Devi and has two sons and two daughters.

Political life 
He has contested the Lohawat assembly election for the first time in 2018.

He represents Lohawat constituency of Jodhpur as Member of Legislative Assembly of Rajasthan.

References 

Indian National Congress politicians from Rajasthan
1965 births
Living people
Rajasthan MLAs 2018–2023